Hugi Glacier is a glacier flowing northward into the head of Holtedahl Bay southwest of Rasnik Peak, on the west coast of Graham Land, Antarctica. It was charted by the British Graham Land Expedition under John Rymill, 1934–37, and was named by the UK Antarctic Place-Names Committee in 1959 for Franz Joseph Hugi, a Swiss teacher who was called the "father of winter mountaineering," and was author of two pioneer works on glacier phenomena.

References

Glaciers of Graham Coast